Alexandr Iashvili (born 23 October 1977) is a Georgian former professional footballer who played as a striker.

Club career

Early years
Born in Tbilisi, Iashvili started his career in Dinamo Tbilisi in 1993, where he became a prolific goalscorer. With 24 goals in 24 games (1994–95) and 26 goals in 25 games (1995–96) he attracted interest from foreign clubs, and at the age of 19 decided to join VfB Lübeck on loan in January 1997.

SC Freiburg
After initially returning to Tbilisi from his loan spell Iashvili permanently moved to play in Germany, signing with SC Freiburg for the 1996–97 season. The team earned promotion to the Bundesliga in his first season there. For the 2005–06 season he was promoted to team captain. In April 2007, he expressed his intention to not renew his Freiburg contract but to instead leave for another, preferably German, club. In his ten years at Freiburg he scored 51 goals in 255 league appearances.

Karlsruher SC
Iashvili subsequently joined Karlsruher SC in summer 2007. In 2009, Iashvili agreed to a contract extension until 2013. In 2012, he was released by Karlsruhe.

Later years
In 2012, Iashvili joined fellow 2. Bundesliga side VfL Bochum.

Iashvili spent the 2013–2014 season with Inter Baku of the Azerbaijan Premier League.

He played for FC Samtredia in his home country in the second half of the 2014–2015 season.

In July 2015, he re-joined his home club Dinamo Tbilisi.

International career
Having played 67 matches scoring 15 goals, Iashvili is the fifth most-capped player of Georgia. With Georgia he won in 1998 the Malta International Football Tournament.

Career statistics

Club

International

Honours
Dinamo Tbilisi
Erovnuli Liga: 1993–94, 1994–95, 1995–96, 1996–97, 1997–98
Georgian Cup: 1993–94, 1994–95, 1995–96, 1996–97
Georgian Super Cup: 1996, 1997

SC Freiburg
2. Bundesliga: 2002–03

Individual
 Georgian Footballer of the Year: 2004, 2008

References

External links
 
 
 
 

Living people
1977 births
Footballers from Tbilisi
Footballers from Georgia (country)
Association football midfielders
Association football forwards
Georgia (country) international footballers
FC Dinamo Tbilisi players
VfB Lübeck players
SC Freiburg players
Karlsruher SC players
VfL Bochum players
Shamakhi FK players
FC Samtredia players
Bundesliga players
2. Bundesliga players
Expatriate footballers from Georgia (country)
Expatriate sportspeople from Georgia (country) in Germany
Expatriate footballers in Germany
Expatriate sportspeople from Georgia (country) in Azerbaijan
Expatriate footballers in Azerbaijan
Georgia (country) under-21 international footballers
Georgia (country) youth international footballers